Bernie Olson is an American educator, businessman, and politician from Montana. Olson is a former Republican member of the Montana House of Representatives.

Early life 
Olson was born in Butte, Montana. He earned a Bachelor of Arts degree from the University of Montana.

Career 
From 1968 to 1974, Olson served in the United States Army Reserve. From 1970 to 1999, he worked as a teacher. In 1999, he became the president of Willow Creek Farm.

On November 5, 2002, Olson was elected to the Montana House of Representatives for the 76th district. He defeated Robert Dale Beck with 99.60% of the votes. On November 2, 2004, he was elected to the 10th district of the Montana House, defeating Aaron Navin Bouschor with 76.15% of the votes.

Olson was inducted into the MEA-MFT Hall of Fame in 2018.

Personal life 
Olson has two children. He and his family live in Lakeside, Montana.

See also 
 Montana House of Representatives, District 10

References

External links 
 REP. BERNIE OLSON (R) - HD10 at leg.mt.gov

1946 births
21st-century American politicians
Educators from Montana
Living people
Republican Party members of the Montana House of Representatives
University of Montana alumni
People from Butte, Montana
Politicians from Butte, Montana
People from Flathead County, Montana